Tanveer Fatima (B.A) was a 2009 Pakistani television drama serial that aired on Geo TV. The serial produced by Hassan Zia and written by Syed Nabeel. The first 72 episodes were directed by Naved Jaffrey and the latter 244 episodes were directed by Syed Nabeel, totalling 316 episodes. Among the cast were Samina Ahmad, Nayyar Ejaz, Shabbir Jan, Humaima Malik, Shehnaz Pervaiz, Danish Nawaz and Yasir Nawaz.

Cast 
 Naheed Shabbir/Humaima Malik as Tanveer Fatima/ Tannu
 Samina Ahmad
 Nayyar Ejaz as Qadir
 Shabbir Jan as Nadir/Bhai Mian
 Danish Nawaz as Kaleem
 Yasir Nawaz
 Rubina Ashraf as Aqeela
 Nazli Nasr as Tannu's sister
 Shehnaz Pervaiz as Guddu
 Farah Ali as Munni
 Sarah Omair
 Darakshan Tahir
 Nadia Khan
 Kamran Jilani as Imran
 Humayun Ashraf as Zeeshan
 Faiq Khan
 Talat Hussain as Shuja Bhai; Head of the society
 Rubina Arif
 Akhtar Husnain as Naazim

References

External links 
 

Geo TV original programming
Urdu-language television shows
2009 Pakistani television series debuts
Pakistani drama television series
2011 Pakistani television series endings